is a Japanese figure skating coach and former competitor. He is the 1976 World Junior silver medalist, winning a medal at the inaugural event. He went on to win six medals in singles at the Japan Figure Skating Championships, and won it twice in pairs. His highest placement as a singles skater at the World Figure Skating Championships was 12th, in 1982. As a pair skater, he placed 12th with Yukiko Okabe in 1980, and 14th with Toshimi Ito in 1983.

He is the father and coach of Takahito Mura. He has also coached Yosuke Takeuchi to the Olympics and Mirai Nagasu.

Results

Single skating

Pair skating with Ito

Pair skating with Okabe

References

 Skatabase: 1980s Worlds - Men
 Skatabase: 1980s Worlds - Pairs

Japanese male single skaters
Japanese male pair skaters
Japanese figure skating coaches
1960 births
Living people
World Junior Figure Skating Championships medalists
Sportspeople from Tottori Prefecture
Universiade medalists in figure skating
Universiade gold medalists for Japan
Competitors at the 1983 Winter Universiade